Delhi Private School, Dubai (DPS) is a CBSE curriculum, private, co-educational day school located in Jebel Ali, Dubai, United Arab Emirates.

The school was previously run by the Delhi Public School Society. However, it is no longer associated with the Delhi Public School Society as it officially ended in May 2018.

Fees
The yearly fees of the school range from Dhs. 10,439 to Dhs. 14,474 depending upon the grade.

History
The school was a co-education school from grades KG1 to Grade 4 till 2014. It was converted to a complete co-education school in 2014 (Grades KG1 to 12).

Campus
This campus is located outside the main city, in The Gardens (Jebel Ali). The school buildings today comprise five computer labs, a physics lab, a biology lab, a chemistry lab, a maths lab, language labs, four libraries, two auditoriums, a basketball court, a cricket ground, a multi-sports complex, a rectangle field for many sports, two cafeterias and two clinics, one for boys and one for girls. They recently added a tennis court managed by tennis coaches.

The school is divided into five blocks:

 Senior block (Students of grade 9 to 12)
 Primary block (Grades KG 1 to Grade 4)
 Milestone block (Grade 5 - 8)
 Administrative Block (Reception, Bookstore, Clinic, Sundeep Hall (auditorium), conference hall, HUGS 1 and 2 rooms (special needs room)
 Sports Complex block (Swimming pool, multi-purpose hall (auditorium and basketball court), table tennis court, volleyball courts, etc.)

DPS Dubai has two sister schools: one in Sharjah as DPS Sharjah and another in Ras Al Khaimah.

See also
 The Winchester School, Jebel Ali, nearby

References

External links
 School website

2003 establishments in the United Arab Emirates
 Educational institutions established in 2003
International schools in Dubai
 Delhi Public School Society
 Private schools in the United Arab Emirates
 Indian international schools in the United Arab Emirates